Rose of Kingston (1978 - 2002) was a Thoroughbred mare who raced with success in Australia, particularly as a three-year-old. She was the Australian Horse of the Year and Australasian Champion Three-Year-Old Filly and Australasian Champion Older Mare in 1982, and after retiring from racing became a broodmare.

She had ten career wins including three Group one races.

Rose of Kingston was the dam of the Melbourne Cup winner Kingston Rule by the American Triple Crown winner, Secretariat. Rose of Kingston was retired from stud duties in 2000 and lived at Kingston Park until her death in June 2002.

References

 Rose Of Kingston's pedigree and partial racing stats

1978 racehorse births
2002 racehorse deaths
Racehorses bred in Australia
Racehorses trained in Australia
Australian Champion Racehorse of the Year
Thoroughbred family 24